The 2008 congressional elections in Illinois were held on November 4, 2008 to determine who would represent the State of Illinois in the United States House of Representatives, coinciding with the presidential and U.S. Senate elections. Representatives are elected for two-year terms; those elected served in the 111th Congress from January 3, 2009 until January 3, 2011.

Illinois has nineteen seats in the House, apportioned according to the 2000 United States Census. Its 2007–2008 congressional delegation consisted of eleven Democrats and eight Republicans. It became, following the election, twelve Democrats and seven Republicans. District 11 was the only seat which changed party (from open Republican to Democratic), although CQ Politics had forecast districts 6, 8, 10, 11, 13, 14 and 18 to be at some risk for the incumbent party.

Overview

District 1

This district includes part of Cook County. Democratic incumbent Bobby Rush, who has held the seat since 1993, ran against Republican nominee Antoine Members. CQ Politics forecast the race as 'Safe Democrat'.

District 2

This district includes parts of Cook County and Will County. Democratic nominee Jesse Jackson, Jr., who has held the seat winning a special election in December 1995, ran against Republican nominee Anthony Williams. CQ Politics forecast the race as 'Safe Democrat'.

District 3

This district includes part of Cook County. Democratic incumbent Dan Lipinski, who has held the seat since 2005, ran against Republican nominee Michael Hawkins and Green Party nominee Jerome Pohlen. CQ Politics forecast the race as 'Safe Democrat'.

Perennial candidate and alleged white supremacist Richard Mayers had attempted to run in the Green Party primary.

District 4

This district includes part of Cook County. Democratic incumbent Luis Gutierrez, who has held the seat since January 1993, ran against Republican nominee Daniel Cunninghan and Green Party nominee Omar López. CQ Politics forecast the race as 'Safe Democrat'.

Earlier in 2007, Cook County Commissioner Roberto Maldonado and Chicago aldermen Manny Flores, Ricardo Muñoz and George Cardenas had announced their intentions to run for the seat in 2008, as Gutierrez had said he planned to retire. However, Gutierrez later changed his mind and announced he would seek re-election in 2008.

District 5

This district includes part of Cook County. Democratic incumbent Rahm Emanuel, who has held the seat since 2003, ran against Republican nominee Tom Hanson and Green Party nominee Alan Augustson. CQ Politics forecast the race as 'Safe Democrat'.

District 6

This district includes parts of DuPage County and Cook County. Freshman Republican incumbent Peter Roskam, who won the then-open seat in a close election in 2006, ran against Democratic nominee Jill Morgenthaler, an Iraq War veteran. CQ Politics forecast the race as 'Republican Favored'.

District 7

This district lies entirely within Cook County. Democratic incumbent Danny K. Davis, who has held the seat since 1997, ran against Republican nominee Steve Miller, a United States Navy veteran. CQ Politics forecast the race as 'Safe Democrat'.

District 8

This district includes parts of Lake County, McHenry County and Cook County. Democratic incumbent Melissa Bean, who has held the seat since 2005, ran against Republican nominee Steve Greenberg. CQ Politics forecast the race as 'Democrat Favored'.

District 9

This district includes all of Evanston, Skokie, Niles, Morton Grove, Park Ridge and Norridge, parts of Wilmette, Northfield, Glenview, Golf, Rosemont and Des Plaines, as well as much of the North Side of Chicago. Democratic incumbent Jan Schakowsky, who has held the seat since 1999, ran against Republican nominee Michael B. Younan and Green Party nominee Morris Shanfield. CQ Politics forecast the race as 'Safe Democrat'.

District 10

This district includes parts of Lake County and Cook County. Republican incumbent Mark Kirk, who has held the seat since 2001, ran against Democratic nominee Dan Seals, who also ran against Kirk in the 2006 election. CQ Politics forecast the race as 'No Clear Favorite'.

District 11

This district includes the towns of Joliet, Kankakee, LaSalle, Ottawa and Streator, as well as all or parts of Will County, Kankakee County, Grundy County, LaSalle County, Bureau County, Woodford County and McLean County. An open seat, Democratic State Senate Majority Leader Debbie Halvorson ran against Republican nominee Marty Ozinga (a local businessman) and Green Party nominee Jason Wallace. CQ Politics forecast the race as 'Democrat Favored'.

Republican incumbent Jerry Weller, who had held the seat since 1995, decided not to seek re-election, leaving this an open seat. Tim Baldermann, mayor of New Lenox and police chief of Chicago Ridge, won the Republican nomination but withdrew on February 23. Martin Ozinga was chosen to replace Baldermann on April 30.

District 12

This district is in the southwest part of the state and includes the cities of Alton, Carbondale and East St. Louis. Democratic incumbent Jerry Costello, who has held the seat since August 1988, ran against Republican nominee Tim Richardson and Chairman of the Metro East Green Party Rodger Jennings. CQ Politics forecast the race as 'Safe Democrat'.

District 13

This district includes parts of the Cook County, DuPage County and Will County. Republican incumbent Judy Biggert, who has held the seat since January 1999, ran against Democratic nominee Scott Harper and Green Party nominee Steve Alesch. CQ Politics initially forecast the race as 'Safe Republican', but changed the forecast to 'Republican Favored' after Harper had raised more money than the 2006 Democratic nominee for this seat by mid-July.

District 14

This district includes the cities of Aurora, Elgin, DeKalb and Dixon, as well as parts of Henry County, Whiteside County, Lee County, DeKalb County, Kane County, Kendall County and DuPage County. Democratic nominee Bill Foster, who had held the seat since March 2008, won against Republican nominee Jim Oberweis, who also lost to Foster in the special election. CQ Politics forecast the race as 'Leans Democratic'.

The district was previously represented by former Speaker of the House Dennis Hastert from 1987 to 2007. He resigned in November 2007; Bill Foster won the special election held on March 8, 2008.

District 15

This district includes the cities of Charleston, Urbana, Danville and Champaign, as well as all or parts of Livingston County, Iroquois County, Ford County, McLean County, DeWitt County, Champaign County, Vermillion County, Macon County, Piatt County, Douglas County, Edgar County, Moultrie County, Coles County, Cumberland County, Clark County, Crawford County, Lawrence County, Wabash County, Edwards County, White County, Saline County and Gallatin County. Republican incumbent Timothy V. Johnson, who has held the seat since January 2001, won against Democratic nominee Steve Cox. CQ Politics forecast the race as 'Safe Republican'.

District 16

This district includes the cities of Rockford, Crystal Lake, Machesney Park, Belvidere, Freeport and Galena, as well as all or parts of Jo Daviess County, Stephenson County, Winnebago County, Boone County, McHenry County, Carroll County, Ogle County, DeKalb County and Whiteside County. Republican incumbent Donald A. Manzullo, who has held the seat since 1993, won against Democratic nominee Robert G. Abboud and Green Party nominee Scott K. Summers.  CQ Politics forecast the race as 'Safe Republican'.

District 17

This district includes the cities of Sterling, Rock Island, Moline, Kewanee, Galesburg, Canton, Macomb, Quincy, Springfield and Decatur, as well as all or parts of Henry County, Whiteside County, Rock Island County, Mercer County, Knox County, Warren County, Henderson County, Fulton County, McDonough County, Hancock County, Adams County, Pike County, Calhoun County, Greene County, Jersey County, Macoupin County, Madison County, Montgomery County, Christian County, Sangamon County, Macon County, Shelby County and Fayette County. Democratic incumbent Phil Hare, who has held the seat since January 2007, ran unopposed. CQ Politics forecast the race as 'Safe Democrat'.

District 18

This district in the central and western part of the state includes the cities of Jacksonville, Peoria and Springfield. Republican nominee Aaron Schock won against Democratic nominee Colleen Callahan and Green nominee Sheldon Schafer. CQ Politics forecast the race as 'Republican Favored'.

Republican incumbent Ray LaHood, who had held the seat since 1995, decided to retire, leaving this an open seat.

District 19

This district in the central part of Southern Illinois includes part of Springfield and the outer St. Louis suburbs. Republican incumbent John Shimkus, who has held the seat since 1997, won against Democratic nominee Daniel Davis and Green Party nominee Troy Dennis. CQ Politics forecast the race as 'Safe Republican'.

See also
2008 United States House of Representatives elections

References

External links
Illinois State Board of Elections

U.S. Congress candidates for Illinois at Project Vote Smart
Campaign contributions for Illinois congressional races from OpenSecrets
Illinois U.S. House of Representatives race from 2008 Race Tracker

2008
Illinois
United States House of Representatives